WBC Dynamo Kursk is a Russian women's basketball club from Kursk playing in the Russian Premier League. They won their first FIBA Eurocup title in 2012. In the 2016–17 season, Kursk won the EuroLeague Women after going undefeated in the competition. In reaction to the 2022 Russian invasion of Ukraine, in February 2022 EuroLeague Women suspended the club.

History
 1994: WBC "Svetlana" Kursk formed.
 1997: renamed Dynamo Kursk.
 1999: started participating in the Russian Women's Super League.
 2008–09: qualified to semi-final in FIBA Eurocup.
 2009–10 and 2010–11: 4th place in the Russian Women's Super League.
 2012: for the first time won the FIBA Eurocup.
 2014–15: in their debut 2014–15 Euroleague won bronze.
 2016–17: for the first time entered final of the 2016–17 Euroleague.
 2022: Suspended by Euroleague Women.

Titles
 FIBA Euroleague:
 Winners: 2016–17
 Runners-up: 2018–19
 Third place: 2014–15, 2017–18
 FIBA Eurocup:
 Winners: 2011–12
 Runners-up: 2013–14
Baltic Women's Basketball League:
 Winners: 2016–17
 Russian Championships:
 Runners-up: 2016–17, 2017–18, 2018–19, 2019–20, 2020–21
 Third place: 2013–14, 2014–15, 2015–16
 Russian Cup:
 Winners: 2014–15, 2015–16, 2017–18, 2019–20
 Runners-up: 2016–17, 2018–19, 2020–21
 Third place: 2013–14

Other achievements
 FIBA Euroleague: Quarterfinals (2015)
 FIBA Eurocup: Semi-Final (2009)
 Russian Women's Basketball Premier League: 4th place (2010, 2011)

Roster

Former notable players
  Işıl Alben
  Anna Petrakova
  Gunta Baško 
  Aušra Bimbaitė
  Temeka Johnson 
  Michelle Snow

References

External links
Official Website

Women's basketball teams in Russia
Sport in Kursk
EuroCup Women-winning clubs
Basketball teams established in 1994
EuroLeague Women clubs